The Sutra of Hearing the Messiah is a Chinese language manuscript about Christian teachings from the Church of the East.  It is considered to be one of the oldest of the Jingjiao Documents, dated between 635 AD and 638 AD. The Sutra of Hearing the Messiah was found at the Mogao Caves in Dunhuang and collected by Takakusu Junjiro.

Contents 
Composed of 206 verses, the document provides a basic outline of the fundamental teachings of Christianity. It begins with twenty verses of invocation about the invisible God and to the heavenly spirits that serve him, followed by a description of humanity and the distance caused by sin and the condition of mortality.  The text continues to speak of the virgin birth and the death of Jesus Christ.  The manuscript is incomplete, ending  abruptly and mid-verse discussing Jesus' death.

Chinese Terms 
This document is thought to have been one of the early missionary devices of the Church of the East, dating around the time of Bishop Alopen, a Syriac-speaking Persian.  The translations of names and religious terms in this text are different to the modern translations, and in some cases show influence from Buddhism.  Some examples of translations of names are given in the table below.

References

External links 
 Classical Chinese text from Chinese Buddhist Electronic Text Association and Suttaworld
 English Translation by P. Y. Saeki

Church of the East in China